Periodic elections for the Tasmanian Legislative Council were held on 2 May 2015. The three seats up for election were the electoral division of Derwent, the electoral division of Mersey and the electoral division of Windermere. Mersey and Windermere were previously contested in 2009, with Derwent contested in a by-election in 2011.

All three seats were retained by the incumbent members.

Derwent
Derwent has been held by Craig Farrell since 2011. At the time of these elections, Farrell was the sole Labor Party member of the Legislative Council. Farrell re-contested the seat against Alan Baker, an IT consultant from New Norfolk.

Mersey
Mersey has been held by independent MLC Mike Gaffney since 2009. Gaffney re-contested the seat against Vivienne Gale, a businesswoman from Launceston, who stated she would move to Devonport in the electorate if elected.

Windermere
Windermere has been held by independent MLC Ivan Dean since 2003. Dean re-contested the seat against Vanessa Bleyer (for the Tasmanian Greens), Jennifer Houston (for the Labor Party) and former union official Scott McLean (independent).

References

External links
Tasmanian Electoral Commission website

2015 elections in Australia
Elections in Tasmania
2010s in Tasmania
May 2015 events in Australia